Francisco de Assis Barbosa (Guaratinguetá, January 21, 1914 – Rio de Janeiro, December 8, 1991) was a Brazilian biographer, essayist, historian, and journalist. He was a member of the Brazilian Academy of Letters.

External links
Biography of Francisco de Assis Barbosa in the webpage of the Brazilian Academy of Letters (in Portuguese).

1914 births
1991 deaths
People from Guaratinguetá
Brazilian male writers
Members of the Brazilian Academy of Letters
Brazilian journalists
Male journalists
20th-century journalists